Joost de Lalaing (c. 1437 – 5 August 1483 near Utrecht), lord of Montigny and of Santes, was a noble from Hainaut who filled several important posts in service of the Burgundian Dukes.

Life
Joost de Lalaing was the eldest son of Simon de Lalaing. In 1468 Charles the Bold appointed him souvereign-bailiff for the County of Flanders.

In 1463 he became Admiral of Flanders. In 1476 he was a member of the Duchal Council of Charles the Bold. From 1477 on he was chamberlain at the court of Charles' daughter, Mary of Burgundy. In 1478 he was made a Knight of the Order of the Golden Fleece. When Wolfert VI of Borselen could no longer control the situation in the Holland and Zeeland, Joost was appointed stadtholder of these regions. He remained stadtholder until his death in 1483. Joost de Lalaing died at the siege of Utrecht, during the Hook and Cod wars.

Marriage and descendants
Joost de Lalaing married Bonne de Viefville in 1462. They had four children:
Charles (1466–1525), 1st count of Lalaing
Antoine (1480–1540), lord of Montigny and 1st count of Hoogstraten and Culemborg
Antonia (?-1540), married Philip, lord of Habart
Margareta, married Philip le Josne, and Louis, lord of Longueval

Sources

 Hans Cools, Mannen met macht, Edellieden en de Moderne Staat in de Bourgondisch-Habsburgse landen (1475–1530). Walburg Pers, Zutphen, 2001. 

Knights of the Golden Fleece
Dutch stadtholders
1430s births
1483 deaths
Year of birth uncertain
Jo